Thin-crust pizza may refer to any pizza baked with especially thin or flattened dough, and, in particular, these types of pizza in the United States:
 Bar pizza, also known as tavern or Chicago-style pizza.
New Haven-style pizza
New York-style pizza
St. Louis-style pizza